The 1991 McDonald's Open took place at Palais Omnisports de Paris-Bercy in Paris, France.

Participants

Games
All games were held at the Palais Omnisports de Paris-Bercy in Paris, France.

Final standings

External links
NBA International Pre-Season and Regular-Season Games
List of champions at a-d-c

1991–92
1991–92 in American basketball
1991–92 in French basketball
1991–92 in Spanish basketball
1991–92 in Croatian basketball
International basketball competitions hosted by France